Circus in the Circus is a Czechoslovak-Soviet comedy film directed by Oldřich Lipský and released in 1976. The story takes place in the Big State Circus in Moscow where two international groups arrive simultaneously: a jury searching for outstanding numbers for the World Circus festival and a delegation of animal language scientists. The film was selected as the Czechoslovakian entry for the Best Foreign Language Film at the 48th Academy Awards, but was not accepted as a nominee. All circus acts were performed by Moscow and Zaporizhia circus troupes.

Cast
 Jiří Sovák as Prof. Ruzicka 
 Iva Janžurová as Doc. Whistlerová
Yevgeny Leonov as Reditel cirkusu
 Natalya Varley as Tána
 Alexander Lenkov as Císník Aljosa
 Leonid Kuravlyov as Grísa
 Savely Kramarov as Lopuchov
 Aleksei Smirnov as a hypnotist Smirnov
 Yevgeny Morgunov as Kolia
Yuri Volyntsev as Aleksandr Borisovich
 Josef Hlinomaz as Nikolai, an elephant trainer
 Jaroslava Schallerová as a zoo-philologist's secretary
 František Filipovský as a Sandy Express reporter
 Zdeněk Dítě as an Italian jury member
 Lubomír Lipský as a Czech jury member
 Oldřich Velen as a Norwegian jury member
 Karel Effa as a vet

See also
 List of submissions to the 48th Academy Awards for Best Foreign Language Film
 List of Czechoslovak submissions for the Academy Award for Best Foreign Language Film

References

External links
 
 Cirkus v cirkuse at «Filmová databáze online»
 Соло для слона с оркестром at «Кино-театр.ru»

1976 films
1976 comedy films
1976 multilingual films
Czech comedy films
1970s Czech-language films
Soviet comedy films
Films directed by Oldřich Lipský
Soviet multilingual films
Czechoslovak multilingual films
Czechoslovakia–Soviet Union relations
Czechoslovak comedy films